Nemertes is a genus of worms, family and order unidentified.

The species of this genus are found in Europe and North America.

Species:

Nemertes annulatus 
Nemertes assimilis 
Nemertes bilineatus
Nemertes maculata 
Nemertes maculosa 
Nemertes microcephala 
Nemertes microphthalma 
Nemertes nigrofuscus 
Nemertes polyhopla 
Nemertes pusilla 
Nemertes roseus 
Nemertes teres

References

Nemertea genera